The following is the family tree of the Spanish monarchs starting from Isabella I of Castile and Ferdinand II of Aragon till the present day.
The former kingdoms of Aragon (see family tree), Castile (see family tree) and Navarre (see family tree) were independent kingdoms that unified in 1469 as personal union, with the marriage of the Catholic Monarchs, to become the Kingdom of Spain (de facto), up to the promulgation of the Nueva Planta decrees by Philip V in 1715 (unification de jure).

Kingdom of Spain

See also
 Descendants of Ferdinand II of Aragon and Isabella I of Castile
 Descendants of Philip V of Spain
 Descendants of Charles III of Spain
 Descendants of Alfonso XIII of Spain
 List of Spanish monarchs
 List of Spanish consorts
 Monarchy of Spain

References

External links
 
 
 
 

Spain
family tree
Spain